Vacuum casting may refer to:

Casting (filling), the general casting concept of using a vacuum to fill a mold cavity
Vacuum casting (elastomers), the casting technique for elastomers
Vacuum molding (casting), a type of sand casting